The FAI International Football Awards is an awards evening held to honour the best Republic of Ireland international footballers of the year.

Senior International awards

Senior International Player of the Year

Senior Women's International Player of the Year

International Goal of the Year

Young International Player of the Year

Youth International

Under-21 International Player of the Year

Under-19 International Player of the Year

Youths Player of the Year

Under-18 International Player of the Year

Under-17 International Player of the Year

Under-16 International Player of the Year

Under-15 International Player of the Year

Women's Youth International

Under-19 Women's International Player of the Year

Under-17 Women's International Player of the Year

Under-16 Women's International Player of the Year

League Player of the Year

Hall of Fame

International Personality

Special Merit Award

Junior International Player of the Year

Intermediate Player of the Year

Football for All International Player of the Year

FAI School's International Player of the Year

Colleges and Universities Player of the Year

Notes

References

Awards
Awards
Republic of Ireland association football trophies and awards
Association football player non-biographical articles